The pterygoid canal (also vidian canal) is a passage in the sphenoid bone of the skull leading from just anterior to the foramen lacerum in the middle cranial fossa to the pterygopalatine fossa.

Structure
The pterygoid canal runs through the medial pterygoid plate of the sphenoid bone to the back wall of the pterygopalatine fossa.

Contents
It transmits the nerve of pterygoid canal, (Vidian nerve), the artery of the pterygoid canal (Vidian artery), and the vein of the pterygoid canal (Vidian vein).

Additional images

External links
 
 

References

Foramina of the skull